XHCHH-FM may refer to:

XHCHH-FM (Chihuahua) in Chihuahua City, D95 94.9 FM
XHCHH-FM (Guerrero) in Zumpango del Río, Capital Máxima 97.1 FM and 650 AM